The men's doubles tournament at the 1982 French Open was held from 24 May until 6 June 1982 on the outdoor clay courts at the Stade Roland Garros in Paris, France. Sherwood Stewart and Ferdi Taygan won the title, defeating Hans Gildemeister and Belus Prajoux in the final.

Seeds

Draw

Finals

Top half

Section 1

Section 2

Bottom half

Section 3

Section 4

External links
 Association of Tennis Professionals (ATP) – main draw
1982 French Open – Men's draws and results at the International Tennis Federation

Men's Doubles
French Open by year – Men's doubles